The heart of Chicago may refer to:

The Heart of Chicago 1967–1997, the fifth greatest hits album by the American band Chicago
The Heart of Chicago 1967–1998 Volume II, the sixth greatest hits album by Chicago
The Heart of... Chicago, an alternate name for the third greatest hits album by Chicago